Kaolack Département is one of the 45 departments of Senegal, located in the Region of Koalack.

It contains five communes: Gandiaye, Kahone, Kaolack, Ndoffane and Sibassor.

Rural districts (Communautés rurales) comprise:
Arrondissement of Koumbal:
Keur Baka
Latmingué
Thiaré
Arrondissement of Ndiédieng:
Keur Socé
Ndiaffate
Ndiédieng
Arrondissement of Ngothie:
Dya
Ndiébel
Thiomby

Historic sites in Kaolack department

 Building housing the Government of Kaolack, Kaolack
 Grand Mosque of Médina Baye, Kaolack
 Ex-Palais de Justice of Kaolack
 Mosque of Diabel Ka
 Mosque Kanène, Léona
 Mosque Serigne Samba Fall, Kasnack
 Tumulus of Ndalane, Gandiaye

References

Departments of Senegal
Kaolack Region